ear X-tacy was a Louisville, Kentucky "alternative record store," owned and operated by John Timmons. The store announced its closing on October 31, 2011, after 26 years in business.

History

ear X-tacy first opened in 1985 in a 500 ft² (46 m²) building stocked with John Timmons' personal records "and a cash advance on his MasterCard." The store name came from the band XTC, of which owner John Timmons is a fan. As the store grew, it changed location three times over a period of sixteen years; it then remained in the same location, in a former bathroom fixtures showroom on Bardstown Road just south of Eastern Parkway in The Highlands, until late July 2010.

ear X-tacy carried a wide variety of CDs, cassettes, and vinyl records, and also carried a large stock of DVDs, including many hard-to-find items. In 1995, Timmons launched the ear X-tacy record label, which released records by Louisville-based musicians such as Tim Krekel.

Due to financial issues, ear X-tacy moved for the final time to a smaller location in 2010, just south of where their previous location was on Bardstown Road. However, the financial issues continued and ear X-tacy owner John Timmons made the decision to permanently close. ear X-tacy officially closed on October 31, 2011, but due to the amount of unsold inventory still remaining after the close, the store held a liquidation sale in December 2011 before officially closing for good.

ear X-tacy also operated a second location in the Eastgate Shopping Center in Middletown from 1992 through 1998. 

The store's signature white-on-black logo stickers spawned a local fad wherein people cut up and reassembled the distinctive letters to form other words or phrases, such as "racy aXe" or "area X."

A documentary on ear X-tacy was released in 2012 under the title Brick and Mortar and Love.

References

External links
ear X-tacy Online

Music retailers of the United States
Culture of Louisville, Kentucky
Defunct companies based in Louisville, Kentucky
American companies established in 1985
Retail companies established in 1985
Retail companies disestablished in 2011